Chandra Pal Tara Singh Bains  (died  5 June 1983) was an Indo-Fijian politician. He  served in the Legislative Council as a nominated member from 1963 to 1966.

Biography
Born in Nausori, Singh was educated at Columbus School in Suva. He began working at Suva Motors in 1940, later becoming a dairy farmer and owning a bus company and sawmill. He was also a soccer administrator and established Navua FC.

Following the 1963 elections he was appointed to the Legislative Council as a nominated member. In 1964 he was appointed to the board of the Fiji Broadcasting Corporation. In 1965 he was part of the Fijian constitutional conference in London. He contested the Indo-Fijian Central cross-voting seat in 1966 general elections as an independent, but finished third behind the candidates of the Alliance Party and Federation Party.

He died in Suva in June 1983 at the age of 69.

References

People from Nausori
Fijian Hindus
Fijian businesspeople
Fijian farmers
Fijian justices of the peace
Members of the Legislative Council of Fiji
1983 deaths